Kevin Jerome Capers (born May 2, 1993) is an American professional basketball player for Atomerőmű SE of the Hungarian League. He played college basketball for Florida Southern College before playing professionally in the NBA G League, Mexico, Romania, Iceland and Israel.

Early life and college career
Capers attended Lake Wales High School in Lake Wales, Florida, where he averaged 8.9 points and 7.0 assists per game from his point guard position. Capers helped the Highlanders to go 31–3 win district and regional titles, and finish as the 2011 5A state runner-up to Dwyer High School.

Capers played college basketball at Florida Southern College, where averaged 17.7 points, 4.3 rebounds and 3.6 assists per game during his four years playing for Florida Southern, he led the Moccasins to the NCAA Division II National Championship as a senior as he earned the Finals MVP and All-tournament team honors.

Professional career

Westchester Knicks (2015–2017)
Capers went undrafted in the 2015 NBA draft. On October 31, 2015, Capers was selected with the 57th pick of the 2015 NBA Development League draft by the Westchester Knicks. In 48 games played during the 2016–17 season for the Knicks, he averaged 8.9 points, 2 rebounds and 2.3 assists per game.

Obregón (2017)
On May 20, 2017, Capers signed with Halcones Ciudad Obregón of the Mexican CIBACOPA. On July 5, 2017, Capers recorded a season-high 32 points, while shooting 11-of-18 from the field, along with three rebounds and three assists in a 94–101 loss to Rayos de Hermosillo. In 25 games played for Obregón, he averaged 16.1 points and 5.4 assists per game as a complement to forward Glen Rice Jr. and his 28.1 points per game. The Hawks toppled the Hermosillo Rays 111–100 in Game 6 of the league finals to clinch the title.

CSU Sibiu (2017–2018)
On August 25, 2017, Capers signed with CSU Sibiu of the Romanian Liga Națională. In 11 games played for Sibiu, he averaged 10.8 points and 1.3 rebounds per game, while shooting 40.6 percent from three-point range.

ÍR (2019)
On January 3, 2019, Capers signed with ÍR of the Icelandic Úrvalsdeild. In 24 games played for ÍR, he finished the season as the league second-leading scorer with 22.3 points, to go with 4.7 rebounds, 5.2 assists and 2 steals per game. Capers led his team to the Úrvalsdeild Finals, where they eventually lost to KR in a five-game series. He missed the fifth and deciding game of the series after breaking a bone in his arm in game four.

Hapoel Ramat Gan (2019–2020)
On October 16, 2019, Capers signed a one-year deal with Hapoel Ramat Gan Givatayim of the Israel National League. On October 22, 2019, Capers set an Israeli State Cup-record 57 points, while shooting 20-of-32 from the field in a 94–104 loss to Hapoel Haifa in the first round. He finished as the top scorer in the league with 24.2 points per game, and recorded 4.1 rebounds, 5.1 assists and 2.3 steals per game.

Atomerőmű (2020–present)
On August 8, 2020, Capers signed with Atomerőmű SE of the Hungarian League.

Personal life
His brother, Marcus, is also a professional basketball player who played college basketball for Washington State University and later professionally in Finland, Japan and Canada.

References

External links
 Florida Southern Moccasins bio
 RealGM profile

1993 births
Living people
American expatriate basketball people in Iceland
American expatriate basketball people in Israel
American expatriate basketball people in Mexico
American expatriate basketball people in Romania
American men's basketball players
Basketball players from Florida
CSU Sibiu players
Florida Southern Moccasins men's basketball players
Halcones de Ciudad Obregón players
Hapoel Ramat Gan Givatayim B.C. players
ÍR men's basketball players
People from Winter Haven, Florida
Point guards
Shooting guards
Úrvalsdeild karla (basketball) players
Westchester Knicks players